Carole Hubs is a former member of the Arizona House of Representatives who served from January 2003 until January 2005. She was elected to the House in November 2002, representing the newly aligned District 4, after redistricting. In 2004, Hubs ran for re-election, but lost in the Republican primary to Judy Burges.

References

Republican Party members of the Arizona House of Representatives
Year of birth missing (living people)
Living people
Women state legislators in Arizona
21st-century American politicians
21st-century American women politicians